TIR-domain-containing adapter-inducing interferon-β (TRIF) is an adapter in responding to activation of toll-like receptors (TLRs). It mediates the rather delayed cascade of two TLR-associated signaling cascades, where the other one is dependent upon a MyD88 adapter.

Toll-like receptors (TLRs) recognize specific components of microbial invaders and activate an immune response to these pathogens. After these receptors recognize highly conserved pathogenic patterns, a downstream signaling cascade is activated in order to stimulate the release of inflammatory cytokines and chemokines as well as to upregulate the expression of immune cells. All TLRs have a TIR domain that initiates the signaling cascade through TIR adapters. Adapters are platforms that organize downstream signaling cascades leading to a specific cellular response after exposure to a given pathogen.

Structure 
TRIF is primarily active in the spleen and is often regulated when MyD88 is deficient in the liver, indicating organ-specific regulation of signaling pathways. Curiously, there is a lack of redundancy within the TLR4 signaling pathway that leads to microbial evasion of immune response in the host after mutations occur within intermediates of the pathway. Three TRAF-binding motifs present in the amino terminal region of TRIF are necessary for association with TRAF6.  Destruction of these motifs reduced the activation of NF-κB, a transcription factor that is also activated by the carboxy-terminal domain of TRIF in the upregulation of cytokines and co-stimulatory immune molecules. This domain recruits receptor-interacting protein (RIP1) and RIP3 through the RIP homotypic interaction motif. Cells deficient for RIP1 gene display attenuated TLR3 activation of NF-κB, indicating the use of the RIP1 gene in downstream TRIF activation, in contrast to other TLRs that use IRAK protein for the activation of NF-κB.

Areas of research 
Investigations into the function of TRIF are of great significance to various fields of biomedical research. The pathogenesis of infectious disease, septic shock, tumor growth, and rheumatoid arthritis all have close ties with TLR signaling pathways, specifically to that of TRIF. Better understanding of the TRIF pathway will be therapeutically useful in the development of vaccines and treatments that can control associated inflammation and antiviral responses. Experiments involving wild-type and TRIF-deficient mice are critical for understanding the coordinated responses of TLR pathways. It is necessary to study the coordinated effects of these pathways in order to understand the complex responses initiated by TRIF.

References

External links
 Toll-like receptor signaling pathway - Reference pathway (KO) from the KEGG website.
 

Immune system